Sukkar or سكڑ or سکړ is a village in Charsadda District, Pakistan.

References

Populated places in Charsadda District, Pakistan